Nils Kristian Heyerdahl (born 11 April 1941) is a Norwegian historian of ideas, theatre director and non-fiction writer. He was theatre director of Radioteatret in the Norwegian Broadcasting Corporation from 1991 to 2011, and is President of the Norwegian Academy from 2011.

References

1941 births
Living people
Writers from Oslo
University of Oslo alumni
Norwegian theatre directors
20th-century Norwegian historians
Norwegian non-fiction writers
NRK people